Tyler Edward Hill (April 23, 1883 - December 2, 1932), known as T. Edward Hill, was a leader in black politics in West Virginia during the early twentieth century coal boom that led many black Americans to migrate from the South to northern coalfields.

Early life and education 
Hill was born on April 23, 1883 in Martinsville, Virginia to Caroline Virginia Harris and James D. Hill. His father was a manager of the Southern Express Railroad Company. Beginning at an early age, Edward was schooled in his family’s genealogical history, learning about his ancestral ties to slavery, white slave owners, and an African chief. This racially-focused family history as remembered by Hill likely inspired him to examine race at a young age.

After his father died in the late 1890s, Hill and his brothers took up work to support their family at a local tobacco factory. Hill quickly rose through the ranks to become a "prize hand" by 1900.

Hill had been educated at a Presbyterian parochial school in Martinsville. After he graduated, he began studying law in Washington, D.C. at historically black Howard University. Through Howard’s program, Hill graduated and passed the bar exam in D.C. and Virginia. In 1904, he  opened a café in D.C. which he ran for four years. In 1908, he sold his café and relocated to a place where his law degree combined with his race would be of particular use: southern West Virginia.

Career and politics 
In the early twentieth century, West Virginia’s black population, particularly in the south of the state, was a powerful political entity. With the coal industry beckoning black southerners to move north to West Virginia for steady employment, thousands of black men and their families flocked into the coalfields during and after the war years. Once there, the force of a large black voting population helped to influence those in political office. In this environment, Hill set up shop as a lawyer and bought a large portion of stock in The McDowell Times, an African American newspaper in Keystone, West Virginia.

Hill and his partner Matthew Thomas (“M.T.”) Whittico, who founded the McDowell Times in 1904, made the paper one of the leading black-published papers in West Virginia. Both Whittico and Hill allowed their personal politics to influence the content of the paper, regularly advancing their conservative Republican values in the paper, which developed a strong local black readership.

Through his association with the McDowell Times, Hill’s growing presence among Republican organizations ensured his elections as President of the McDowell County Colored Republican Organization in 1916, Secretary of the McDowell County Republican Executive Committee, and Delegate for the Fifth Congressional District to the Republican National Convention in 1912, 1916, and 1920.

Perhaps his most influential position would arise out of Hill’s election as President of the West Virginia State League (WVSL) which held a particularly powerful station in lobbying political leaders to pass legislature that benefited black people in the state. In tandem with other black activist groups such as the much larger Commission on Interracial Cooperation (CIC) that was organized in reaction to racial violence flaring up after World War I, the WVSL’s mission was to address any issue related to the well being of the entire black population of the state. It used its influential members and the power of its constituency to advocate for big bills like the Capehart Anti-Lynch bill, which was made law in 1921, and to push for the founding of the West Virginia Bureau of Negro Welfare and Statistics (BNWS), of which Hill was appointed the first Director.

Director of the Bureau of Negro Welfare and Statistics 
As the first director of West Virginia's Bureau of Negro Welfare and Statistics (BNWS), Hill was tasked with laying out plans for the new bureau. In an early publication, Hill described the BNWS's role saying it was 

Despite, and perhaps because of, the massive post-war strikes taking place in the West Virginia coal mines, Hill became a “staunch anti-union” man as the Director of the BNWS. In his first report as Director, Hill boasted about the Bureau persuading black coal miners not to join the infamous Battle of Blair Mountain and instead, making those men strikebreakers. Hill also helped to form a black separatist community in Pocahontas County, West Virginia early in his leadership of the BNWS. The Watoga Land Association was begun to give black coal miners a chance to own land for themselves and create new lives based on subsistence farming and a network of community support in an all-black community.

Hill died from suicide after an extended illness at age 49 in Charleston, West Virginia. He was married and had a son and two daughters.

References 

1883 births
1932 deaths
1932 suicides
20th-century African-American people
African-American men in politics
African-American people in West Virginia politics
American newspaper publishers (people)
American anti-lynching activists
Coal mining in Appalachia
People from McDowell County, West Virginia
Suicides in West Virginia
West Virginia lawyers
West Virginia politicians
West Virginia Republicans
Suicides by sharp instrument in the United States